Secretary of the Communist People's Party of Kazakhstan (QKHP) and Mazhilis MP Jambyl Ahmetbekov was unanimously nominated as a presidential candidate at the party's 14th Congress on 26 April 2019. Ahmetbekov was the party's nominee in the 2011 presidential election where he earned 3rd place in the race and took 1.36% of the vote. He began collecting signatures on 29 April and was finished by 4 May 2019. Ahmetbekov was officially registered by the Central Election Commission on 6 May. He expressed his confidence in the race claiming his experience and known popularity would benefit him. Ahmetbekov's campaign officially announced the electoral platforms on 14 May and the following day, Ahmetbekov himself presented them in the villages of Korgalzhyn and Shalkar in Akmola Region.

Policies 
 Bringing oligarchic fugitives to justice
 Taxation for the rich
 Ending poverty
 Rejection of westernization
 Economic integration with neighboring countries

Economic policy 
Ahmetbekov advocated the continuation of economic integration in international relations with neighboring countries, both within the Eurasian Economic Union (EEU) and the Belt and Road Initiative with China. Although he stated that "economic interaction with the closest neighbors should carry the basis for the growth of the well-being of ordinary Kazakhstanis, not oligarchs."

Campaign 
Throughout the campaign, Ahmetbekov took a populist tone where he blamed the lack of social spending on "fugitive oligarchs" in which he referred to exiled Kazakh banker and politician Mukhtar Ablyazov by accusing of stealing all the government budget money. He called for prosecution and tighter legislation to combat the problem. In an interview to Vlast.kz, Ahmetbekov proposed for regulation of certain content on the internet by having Kazakhstan creating its own Facebook, telling that "no one from the outside would act on us, on our brains! The same fugitive oligarch like Ablyazov. Or his supporters, or his henchmen who process the brains."

On 20 May 2019, he held meeting with the labor collective of the Kyzylorda Bus Depot.

Results 
Results of the 2019 presidential election

References 

2019 Kazakh presidential election
Ahmetbekov
2019 Kazakh presidential campaigns